Susan Lanier-Bramlett better known as Susan Lanier, is an American actress.

Early life
 
Born as Susan Jean Engledow in Dallas, Texas to Gene and Dorothy Lanier Engledow, she moved to New York City to pursue an acting career in 1967 where she attended New York University.  After appearing in numerous off Broadway productions, TV commercials, and indie films in which she appeared as Jean Lanier, she relocated to Los Angeles in 1974.

Career
Lanier had a guest appearance on Welcome Back, Kotter where she played a flirtatious student named Bambi, who initially makes a move on Gabe. During the 1970s, she guest starred on shows such as Barnaby Jones, Electra Woman and Dyna Girl, Alice, Police Woman and Eight is Enough.

In 1976, she starred alongside John Ritter and Joyce DeWitt in the second pilot for Three's Company on ABC. Lanier, who served as the original choice by the producers to portray the newly created character Chrissy Snow, replaced Susanne Zenor in the cast when the characters, that were directly based from the original British sitcom Man About The House were done away with, but Lanier herself was then replaced by Suzanne Somers. In 1977, Lanier starred in the original cult classic, The Hills Have Eyes. She also starred as Sandi Chandler on the television series Szysznyk from 1977 – 1978.

She was a series regular on Tony Orlando and Dawn's Rainbow Hour for a season on CBS doing stand-up and comedy sketches with the show's guests. In the late 1970s, Lanier starred at The Ahmanson Theatre in Los Angeles in a production of Tennessee Williams' (né Thomas Lanier Williams, to whom, like actress Diane Ladd, she is related) The Night of the Iguana, which starred Richard Chamberlain.
  
In the 1980s, Lanier had her own country-blues band and performed in the LA club scene. She wrote music with her future and now late husband, legendary rock/blues artist, Delaney Bramlett, writer of "Superstar" and "Never Ending Song of Love" fame.

She continued to act in movies of the week such as Madame X (1981), The Night the Bridge Fell Down (1983) and Her Life As A Man (1984), and had recurring roles on TV in the soap, Days of Our Lives, and the sitcom, So Little Time with the Olsen twins. She starred in 2003 in the Los Angeles stage production of Last of The Honkey Tonk Angels.

Personal life
Lanier was married to musician Delaney Bramlett; she was Bramlett's third wife, following his divorce from Bonnie Bramlett and Kim Carmel Bramlett. Delaney died in 2008 from complications of gall bladder surgery.

Lanier is the parent of Dickies and 45 Grave guitarist Dylan Thomas.

Photographer
Lanier became a portrait photographer for magazines, book covers, and album covers, and in 2005 was voted one of LA's top ten photographers by Backstage West.

References

External links

Living people
American film actresses
American photographers
American television actresses
Actresses from Dallas
American women photographers
21st-century American women
Year of birth missing (living people)